Andrzej Stępień (born 14 July 1953 in Cieplice Śląskie) is a Polish former sprinter who specialised in the 400 metres. He represented his country at the 1980 Summer Olympics and 1983 World Championships. He was a national outdoor 400 metres champion each year between 1981 and 1986.

His personal bests in the event are 46.10 seconds outdoors (Budapest 1981) and 47.08 seconds indoors (Pireaus 1985).

International competitions

1Did not finish in the final

References

1953 births
Living people
Polish male sprinters
Athletes (track and field) at the 1980 Summer Olympics
Olympic athletes of Poland
People from Jelenia Góra
20th-century Polish people